Charles Norman may refer to:

 Charles Norman (British Army officer) (1891–1974), served in World War I and World War II
 Charles Norman (cricketer) (1833–1889), English cricketer and banker

See also
 Charles Normand